The 2015 Tour of Austria is the 67th edition of the Tour of Austria cycling stage race. It started in Wien on 4 July with a team time trial prologue, and concluded in Bregenz on 12 July. This was the first time in several years that the race  consisted of 8 stages plus a prologue. It was part of the 2015 UCI Europe Tour, and was rated as a 2.HC event.

Schedule

Teams
20 teams were invited to the 2015 Tour of Austria: 6 UCI ProTeams, 7 UCI Professional Continental Teams and 7 UCI Continental Teams.

Stages

Prologue
4 July 2015 — Wien,  team time trial (TTT)

Stage 1
5 July 2015 – Mörbisch to Scheibbs,

Stage 2
6 July 2015 – Litschau to Grieskirchen,

Stage 3
7 July 2015 – Windischgarsten to Judendorf-Straßengel,

Stage 4
8 July 2015 – Stift Rein/Gratwein to Dobratsch,

Stage 5
9 July 2015 – Faaker See/Drobollach to Matrei in Osttirol,

Stage 6
10 July 2015 – Lienz to Kitzbüheler Horn,

Stage 7
11 July 2015 – Kitzbühel to Innsbruck,

Stage 8
12 July 2015 – Innsbruck to Bregenz,

Classification leadership table

References

Tour of Austria
Tour of Austria
Tour of Austria